The Petite Terre skink (Mabuya parviterrae) is a species of skink found in Guadeloupe.

References

Mabuya
Reptiles described in 2016
Endemic fauna of Guadeloupe
Reptiles of Guadeloupe
Taxa named by Stephen Blair Hedges